Diplocynodon is an extinct genus of alligatoroid that lived during the Paleocene to Middle Miocene in Europe. It looked very similar to the modern caiman in that it was small and had bony armour scutes covering its neck, back, belly, and tail. The longest Diplocynodon recovered was 4 feet in length and probably fed on small fish, frogs, and took insects when young.

In the nineteenth century, D. steineri was named from Styria, Austria and D. styriacus was named from Austria and France. A third Austrian species, Enneodon ungeri, was placed in its own genus. The Austrian and French species of Diplocynodon were synonymized with E. ungeri in 2011, and because the name Diplocynodon has priority over Enneodon, the species is now called D. ungeri. Other genera have recently been found to be synonymous with Diplocynodon. Hispanochampsa muelleri of Spain was determined to be synonymous with Diplocynodon in 2006, and Baryphracta deponaie of Germany was confirmed to be synonymous with Diplocynodon in 2012.

Well preserved specimens have been found in the Messel Pit and the Geiseltal lignite deposit in Germany. Most articulated Diplocynodon specimens from these localities contain gastroliths. In the Eocene epoch, the German sites were either a swampy freshwater lake (Messel Pit) or a peat bog swamp (Geiseltal).

Species

*Locality and/or horizon of the type specimen.

Phylogeny
Diplocynodon is one of the basal-most members of the superfamily Alligatoroidea. Diplocynodon's placement within Alligatoroidea can be shown in the cladogram below, based on a 2018 tip dating study by Lee & Yates that simultaneously used morphological, molecular (DNA sequencing), and stratigraphic (fossil age) data.

Below is a more detailed cladogram of Diplocynodon:

References

 Fossils (Smithsonian Handbooks) by David Ward (Page 243)

External links
Discover
Geo Science

Crocodilians
Paleocene crocodylomorphs
Eocene crocodylomorphs
Oligocene crocodylomorphs
Miocene crocodylomorphs
Miocene genus extinctions
Paleocene reptiles of Europe
Paleocene first appearances
Eocene reptiles of Europe
Oligocene reptiles of Europe
Miocene reptiles of Europe
Prehistoric pseudosuchian genera
Fossils of Austria

Fossil taxa described in 1847